Mongrel are a British band formed in 2008, founded by former Arctic Monkeys bassist Andy Nicholson. Alongside Nicholson in the band are Joe Moskow, both of Reverend and The Makers, Babyshambles bassist Drew McConnell as well as London rapper Lowkey from the Poisonous Poets.

Mongrel released their first album Better Than Heavy on 7 March 2009. The band have announced they will play a show at London's Boston Arms on 5 November, with a four-track digital EP due for release the same day.

For the album, McClure stated "We had Saul Williams come in and do a thing on it and hopefully M.I.A. is going to do something and maybe Pete Doherty. It's got a good flavour... We're really taking a few people to task, kind of like we're Public Enemy or something." In an interview with The Guardian, McClure also expressed a desire to record in Venezuela and work with Venezuelan president Hugo Chávez for the band's second album.

Release
Better Than Heavy was released on Saturday 7 March 2009 free in The Independent newspaper. It was the first time a British band had given their début album away free with a national newspaper on release.  The full release, 23 March 2009, contains two CDs, Disc 2 is a reworked version of "Better Than Heavy" by Adrian Sherwood at On-U Sound Studios, tracks are re-titled Dub versions.

Discography
Albums
Better Than Heavy (2009)

References

External links
Mongrel on Myspace

English indie rock groups